Murder in Chelsea is a 1934 detective novel by E.C.R. Lorac, the pen name of the British writer Edith Caroline Rivett. It is the seventh book featuring Chief Inspector MacDonald of Scotland Yard who appeared in a lengthy series of novels during the Golden Age of Detective Fiction.

Synopsis
A young woman, a keen bibliophile and co-owner of a bookshop, is found gassed to death in the bed of her Chelsea home.

References

Bibliography
 Cooper, John & Pike, B.A. Artists in Crime: An Illustrated Survey of Crime Fiction First Edition Dustwrappers, 1920-1970. Scolar Press, 1995.
 Hubin, Allen J. Crime Fiction, 1749-1980: A Comprehensive Bibliography. Garland Publishing, 1984.
 Nichols, Victoria & Thompson, Susan. Silk Stalkings: More Women Write of Murder. Scarecrow Press, 1998.
 Reilly, John M. Twentieth Century Crime & Mystery Writers. Springer, 2015.

1934 British novels
British mystery novels
Novels by E.C.R. Lorac
Novels set in London
British detective novels
Sampson Low books